ParisTech is a cluster that brings together 10 renowned grandes écoles based in Paris, France. It covers the whole spectrum of science, technology and management and has more than 20.000 students.

ParisTech offers 21 Master programmes, 95 Advanced Masters (Mastères Spécialisés), several MBA programmes and a vast range of PhD programmes.

History
In 1991, a number of engineering Grandes Écoles set up a coordinating voluntary association, called 'Grandes écoles d'ingénieurs de Paris', to foster closer collaboration in areas of common interest and thereby acquire international recognition as an entity of sufficient size and importance. In 1999 its name was changed to "ParisTech".

In 2007, ParisTech's status changed to a higher education institution (public establishment for scientific cooperation / établissement public de coopération scientifique). It was headed by a President, assisted by an executive bureau and a secretary general and administrated by a board of directors, supported by a strategic orientation council and a scientific council. The board of directors includes one representative of each college or institute as well as researchers, faculty members, and one representative of the students.

In 2016, ParisTech became a foundation under the umbrella of Fondation ParisTech, which was founded in 2010. At first, ParisTech had 10 members. But since 2016, it comprises 7 members: AgroParisTech, Arts et Métiers ParisTech, Chimie ParisTech, Ecole des Ponts ParisTech, ESPCI Paris, Institut d'Optique Graduate School and Mines ParisTech. Since 2018, president of ParisTech is Christian Lerminiaux, president of Chimie ParisTech, vice presidents are Sophie Mougard (Ecole des Ponts) and Gilles Trystram (AgroParisTech).

Members

The member institutes of ParisTech are long-established and renowned grandes écoles, many of which were founded in the 18th century. Some deliver a high-level, broad education in sciences such as Arts et Métiers, MINES ParisTech, École des Ponts ParisTech, whereas others provide a research-focused level of expertise in selected scientific disciplines, such as AgroParisTech (agriculture and environmental sciences), Chimie ParisTech (chemistry), ESPCI Paris (physics, chemistry and biology) and Institut d'Optique Graduate School (physics and optics).

ParisTech was a former member of IDEA League, an alliance between universities in science and technology in Europe, and is still a member of the ATHENS Programme. It is a member of the CESAER, the European association of universities in science and technology.

The member colleges and institutes are:
École Nationale Supérieure d'Arts et Métiers (Arts et Métiers), founded in 1780
École nationale des ponts et chaussées (École des Ponts ParisTech), founded in 1747
Institut des sciences et industries du vivant et de l'environnement (AgroParisTech), founded in 2007 
École supérieure de physique et de chimie industrielles de la ville de Paris (ESPCI Paris), founded in 1882
École nationale supérieure de chimie de Paris (Chimie ParisTech), founded in 1896
École nationale supérieure des mines de Paris (Mines ParisTech), founded in 1783
Institut d'Optique Graduate School (SupOptique), founded in 1920

Former members:
École nationale de la statistique et de l'administration économique (ENSAE Paris), founded in 1942
École nationale supérieure des télécommunications (Télécom Paris), founded in 1878
École nationale supérieure de techniques avancées (ENSTA Paris), founded in 1741

Facts and Figures
From the official website:
1,500 teachers-researchers
12,500 students (31% of whom are international students)
1,700 PhD candidates
90,000 alumni
86 research laboratories
450 doctoral theses defended every year

Locations
AgroParisTech, Arts et Métiers, ESPCI Paris - PSL, Chimie ParisTech - PSL and MINES ParisTech - PSL are located close to one another in the Latin Quarter, the district on the left bank of the Seine where intellectual life has been thriving since the Middle Ages. However, some institutes also created additional sites on the outskirts of Paris or in other parts of the country.

Some years ago, the École nationale des ponts et chaussées eventually moved its educational and research facilities to more spacious facilities in greater Paris, in Marne-la-Vallée (East). SupOptique has relocated to the Palaiseau campus recently.

Besides its Latin Quarter location, AgroParisTech, the ParisTech college that specializes in life, food, and environmental sciences, also is located at eight other sites, including sites on the Parisian outskirts (including an experimental farm used for education and research, at the Château de Grignon in the West of the Paris), in other parts of mainland France, and Guyane. Similarly for Arts et Métiers, only the main one of its 8 campuses is located in Paris. The other teaching and research centers are spread in the country, closer to the industrial fabric of each region. Different specializations are available in the campuses, such as Aerospace in Bordeaux and materials science in Metz.

Education
ParisTech offers a variety of courses, independently or in partnership with other institutions (in particular doctoral and master's degrees), in the core disciplines of science and technology at postgraduate level. Its main programmes are:
the "Ingénieur" degree (equivalent to a master's degree of science in engineering) delivering a broad understanding of fundamental Engineering Science and a thorough introduction to Economics, Management and Communication. The admission to the Ingénieur degree is widely known as being highly selective. Students are admitted through nationwide competitive examinations for students having completed two years of Classes Préparatoires in France or abroad, or by virtue of outstanding academic records. 
Master of Science (MSc) programmes, courses designed to provide an in-depth understanding in various fields of science ranging from Mathematics to Economics delivered by the schools on their own (e.g. Ecole des Ponts ParisTech, AgroParisTech outside Paris). Admission to MSc programmes is open to students holding a Bachelor of Science (BSc) or a Bachelor of Engineering (BEng) from a French or international university. Each master program has its own specific admissions requirements.
Mastères spécialisés (Post-master professional certificates) enable students which have already completed a master's degree to develop their knowledge in a speciality to a high standard.
Doctoral programmes (PhD): ParisTech laboratories play host to 1700 doctoral students. Thesis enrolment is handled by each doctoral school to which the host laboratory is attached.
ParisTech schools also offer continuing education courses aimed at professionals, accessible with a Bachelor or university degree, with courses to the degrees of Ingénieur, Master, Specialized Master or Doctorate.

ParisTech has also developed since 2019 the RACINE network for pedagogical training of teachers. The network organises 10 workshops each year that are dedicated to teaching in engineering schools.

Diversity
ParisTech schools are strongly committed to diversify the profile of their students. Therefore they support high school pupils or students in preparatory classes ("cordées de la réussite).

ParisTech is also one of the founders of Institut Villebon-Georges Charpak where students with strong scientific potential are taught in a very original way so that their talent can be recognized by companies. 25% of them are then admitted in well-known engineering schools like ParisTech schools.

Research
ParisTech schools hosted Field Medal awardee in the last decades, e.g. Pierre-Louis Lions, and als Nobel Prize awardees: Maurice Allais, Pierre-Gilles de Gennes and Georges Charpak. The CNRS, one of the biggest research organisation worldwide, delivered a Gold Medal to Alain Aspect as well as the Silver Medal  Jacques Prost, Philippe Grangier, Jérôme Bibette, Catherine Bréchignac, Mathias Fink, Michel Callon, Daniel Lincot, Ludwik Leibler, Michel Fliess, Francisco Chinesta, Janine Cossy, Tatiana Budtova, Anke Lindner and Antoine Browaeys, and the Bronze Medal to  Valentina Krachmalnicoff, Teresa Lopez-Leon and Kevin Vinck, all researchers in ParisTech labs

ParisTech schools host also a lot of grantees of the European Research Council:

- Arts et Métiers : Nicolas Ranc (Consolidator grant)

- Chimie ParisTech - PSL : Ilaria Ciofini (Advanced grant), Philippe Marcus (Advanced Grant), Gilles Gasser (Consolidator Grant), Guillaume Lefèvre (Starting Grant), Philippe Goldner (Advanced grant)

- Ecole des Ponts ParisTech : Philippe Jehiel (Advanced grant), Ioannis Stefanou (Starting Grant), Eric Cances (Synergy Grant)

- ESPCI Paris - PSL : Costantino Creton (Advanced grant & Synergy grant), Luca de Mici (Advanced grant), Eörs Szathmary (PoC), Klaus Eyer (Starting grant), Sandrine Ithurria (Starting grant), Anke Lindner (Consolidator grant), Sylvain Gigan, Karim Benchenane (Consolidator grant), Alexandre Aubry (Consolidator grant), Mickael Tanter, Bruno Andreotti (Starting grant), Manuel Thery (Starting grant), Martin Lenz (Starting grant), Thomas Preat (Advanced grant), Philippe Nghe (Consolidator grant)

- Institut d'Optique : Laurent Sanchez-Palencia (Starting grant), Alexei Ourjoumtsev (Advanced grant), Pierre Bon (starting grant), Philippe Grangier (advanced grant), Antoine Browaeys (Starting grant & Advanced grant)

- MINES ParisTech - PSL : Fabien Muniesa (Starting grant), Jean-Philippe Vert (Starting grant), Zaki Leghtas (Starting Grant), Pierre Rouchon (Advanced Grant)

Claire Chenut, Professor in soil science at AgroParisTech, was award the "Laurier d'or de la recherche agronomique" of INRAE in 2019.

Céline Guivarch, researcher at Ecole des Ponts ParisTech, obtained the Irène Joliot Curie  Prize for young woman scientist in 2020.

ParisTech schools have also created chairs funded by private partners:

- Chaire BioMecam Handicap & Innovation since 2010 with Arts et Métiers et ESPCI Paris - PSL and support of Société générale,  Fondation Cotrel, Proteor and COVEA

- Chaire Mines urbaines (Urban Mining): since 2014 Arts et Métiers, Chimie ParisTech - PSL and MINES ParisTech - PSL with support of ecosystem

- The Lab Research Environment VINCI ParisTech since 2008

- The Institute of sustainable mobility (Institut de la mobilité durable) funded by Renault since 2009

International

ParisTech schools recruit since more than 20 years international students in China, Brazil, Colombia, Russia and since 2018 in Argentina. In 2021 ParisTech open this ParisTech International Admission Program to new countries and regions in Asia : Cambodia, Hong Kong, India, Indonesia, Japan, Laos, Macao, Malaysia, Singapore, South Korea, Taiwan, Thailand, Vietnam.

Meanwhile, ParisTech has also developed a network in Europe called ATHENS (since 1997) with 14 European partner institutions. Thanks to this network the ParisTech schools have created a strategic partnership dedicated to PhD training and funded by Erasmus+. Moreover some of the schools are involved in European universities : Chimie ParisTech - PSL, Ecole des Ponts ParisTech and MINES ParisTech - PSL are members of the European University EELISA (European Engineering Learning Innovation Science Alliance) as well as AgroParisTech and Institut d'Optique are members of EUGLOH via University of Paris-Saclay.

ParisTech schools contribute to 4 Sino-French Institutes in China: in Shanghai with SPEIT (MINES ParisTech - PSL), in Wuhan with the Sino-European Institute ICARE for renewable energy (MINES ParisTech - PSL), in Guangzhou with IFCEN (Chimie ParisTech - PSL) and since 2017 in Beijing Chimie Pékin (Chimie ParisTech - PSL).

References

External links

ParisTech website

 
University associations and consortia in France
Universities in Paris
Universities in Île-de-France
Paris-Saclay
1991 establishments in France
Educational institutions established in 1991